2006 Auckland Open was a darts tournament that took place in Auckland, New Zealand, in 2006.

Results

Men

Women

References

2006 in darts
2006 in New Zealand sport
Darts in New Zealand